Pavetta blanda is a species of flowering plant in the family Rubiaceae, native to the Laccadive Islands, south India and Sri Lanka.

References

blanda
Flora of the Laccadive Islands
Flora of India (region)
Flora of Sri Lanka
Plants described in 1934